Parakala Prabhakar (born 2 January 1959) is an Indian political economist and social commentator. He served as Communications Advisor, held a cabinet rank position in Andhra Pradesh Government between July 2014 and June 2018. For several years he presented a current affairs discussion programme on television channels of Andhra Pradesh. His programmes, Pratidhwani on ETV2 and Namaste Andhra Pradesh on NTV. He was also a former spokesman and one of the founding  general secretaries of Praja Rajyam Party. In the early 2000s, Parakala was the spokesperson of the Andhra Pradesh unit of the BJP. He is the spouse of the incumbent union Minister of Finance and Corporate Affairs of India, Nirmala Sitharaman

Personal life
Parakala was born in a prominent Telugu Brahmin family in Narsapuram, Andhra Pradesh. His mother, Parakala Kalikamba was a Member of Legislative Assembly in Andhra Pradesh, while his father, Parakala Seshavatharam, was a long time Legislator and served in three successive Cabinets in the state of Andhra Pradesh in the 1970s and early 1980s.
Parakala completed his doctorate from the London School of Economics. He did his Master of Arts (M.A.) and Master of Philosophy (M.Phil.) from Jawaharlal Nehru University (JNU), New Delhi.

Prabhakar married Nirmala Sitharaman in 1986, who is the Minister of Finance and Corporate Affairs  of the Government of India in Narendra Modi's cabinet, in 2019. They have a daughter.

References

External links
 LinkedIn
 Twitter

Living people
Jawaharlal Nehru University alumni
Alumni of the London School of Economics
1959 births
People from West Godavari district
Praja Rajyam Party politicians
Bharatiya Janata Party politicians from Andhra Pradesh